ERGO Baby, Inc is an American company specializing in the manufacture and sale of baby carriers and other accessories.

Ergobaby was founded 2003 by Karin Frost in Maui, Hawaii.  Since 2010 Ergobaby is owned by the private equity fund CODI - Compass Diversified Holdings.   In 2011 Ergobaby acquired the stroller company Orbit baby. In May 2013 Margaret Hardin was appointed as new Chief Executive Officer. In May 2016 it was announced that ERGO Baby will acquire the Baby Tula which will be made a subsidiary of ERGO Baby. ERGO Baby currently has its headquarters in Los Angeles, California.

In 2010  and 2011, the company hired Washington, D.C.-based law firm, Greenberg & Lieberman to represent them in several UDRP disputes.

References

External links
Official site
Blog

Companies based in Hawaii
Baby products